27th FFCC Awards
December 22, 2022

Best Picture:
Everything Everywhere All at Once

The 27th Florida Film Critics Circle Awards were held on December 22, 2022.

The nominations were announced on December 14, 2022, led by Everything Everywhere All at Once with eleven nominations.

Winners and nominees

Winners are listed at the top of each list in bold, while the runner-ups for each category are listed under them.

References

External links
 

2022 film awards
2020s